Chris Taliaferro is a Democratic Alderman representing the 29th ward of the city of Chicago. The 29th ward includes the Austin, Montclare and Galewood areas.

Aldermanic career
Taliaferro was elected alderman in 2015, unseating incumbent Deborah L. Graham. He was reelected in 2019.

He is a member of the following committees; Human Relations, Committees, Rules and Ethics, License and Consumer Protection, Pedestrian and Traffic Safety, Public Safety and Transportation and Public Way. He is a member of the Chicago City Council's Progressive Reform Caucus, its Veterans Caucus and its Black Caucus.

In the runoff of the 2019 Chicago mayoral election, Taliaferro endorsed Toni Preckwinkle. Taliaferro has been considered a City Council ally of Mayor Lori Lightfoot during her time as mayor.

In June 2022, Taliaferro lost a primary election for a Cook County judgeship.

References

External links
29th Ward Constituent Services Website

1965 births
21st-century American politicians
African-American people in Illinois politics
Chicago City Council members
Illinois Democrats
John Marshall Law School (Chicago) alumni
Lewis University alumni
Living people
People from Smithfield, Virginia
21st-century African-American politicians
20th-century African-American people